Peltospira smaragdina is a species of sea snail, a marine gastropod mollusk in the family Peltospiridae.

Distribution
This species occurs on the Mid-Atlantic Ridge.

Description 
The maximum recorded shell length is 12 mm.

Habitat 
Minimum recorded depth is 870 m. Maximum recorded depth is 3520 m.

References

External links
 Warén A. & Bouchet P. (2001). Gastropoda and Monoplacophora from hydrothermal vents and seeps new taxa and records. The Veliger, 44(2): 116-231

Peltospiridae
Gastropods described in 2001